Liriodenine is a bio-active isolate of the Chinese medicinal herb Zanthoxylum nitidum. It was isolated for the first time, at least with the name liriodenine, from the heartwood of Liriodendron tulipifera, the common yellow poplar of the south-eastern USA. It is found in very many other plants, notably in Annona cherimolia and Annona muricata, widely cultivated for their edible fruit.

External links
 Synthesis, characterization, and in vitro antitumor properties of gold(III) compounds with the traditional Chinese medicine (TCM) active ingredient liriodenine

Benzylisoquinoline alkaloids
Dibenzoquinolines
Benzodioxoles
Oxygen heterocycles
Ketones